Events from the year 2004 in Macau, China.

Incumbents
 Chief Executive - Edmund Ho
 President of the Legislative Assembly - Susana Chou

Events

May
 18 May - The opening of Sands Macao in Sé.

June
 11 June - 2004 Hong Kong–Macau Interport.

August
 27 August - The launch of Macau Post Daily.

December
 19 December - The opening of Sai Van Bridge connecting Taipa and Sé.
 30 December - The opening of Handover Gifts Museum of Macao in Sé.

References

 
Years of the 21st century in Macau
Macau
Macau
2000s in Macau